London 1950 may refer to:
 London International Stamp Exhibition 1950
 London Nationals (1950–), a Canadian junior ice hockey team
 London Ski jumping competition 1950 & 1951
 1950 World Ice Hockey Championships, held in London
 1950 World Figure Skating Championships, held in London
 1950 FA Cup Final, held in London

See also
 London
 1950 in the United Kingdom